WSCL (89.5 FM) is a National Public Radio member station in Salisbury, Maryland, owned by Salisbury University.

WSCL's signal takes advantage of the flat geography of Delmarva. It can be heard on car radios in portions of Northern Delaware and its bordering areas of Pennsylvania, across the Delaware Bay in New Jersey, along Interstate 95 between Baltimore and Washington, in addition to its local areas of Delaware, Maryland, and Virginia.

External links

SCL
NPR member stations
Salisbury University
SCL
Radio stations established in 1983
1983 establishments in Maryland
Classical music in the United States